The Juno Awards of 1989, representing Canadian music industry achievements of the previous year, were awarded on 12 March 1989 in Toronto at a ceremony in the O'Keefe Centre. André-Philippe Gagnon was the host for the ceremonies, which were broadcast on CBC Television.

Blue Rodeo won in three of its five nominations: Best Group, Best Single and Best Video. k.d. lang and Robbie Robertson were also notable winners in 1989.

The previous Juno Awards ceremonies were conducted on 2 November 1987. There was no awards event in 1988 due to a decision to restore the Juno scheduling to the earlier portion of each year. The awards had been conducted early each year from its 1970 inception until 1984.

Nominees and winners

Canadian Entertainer of the Year
(This award was chosen by a national poll rather than by Juno organisers CARAS.)

Winner: Glass Tiger

Other Nominees:
 Bryan Adams
 Barney Bentall and the Legendary Hearts
 Blue Rodeo
 Tom Cochrane & Red Rider
 Bruce Cockburn
 Leonard Cohen
 Colin James
 k.d. lang
 Robbie Robertson

Best Female Vocalist
Winner: Céline Dion

Other Nominees:
 Johanne Blouin
 k.d. lang
 Rita MacNeil
 Anne Murray

Best Male Vocalist
Winner: Robbie Robertson

Other Nominees:
 Bruce Cockburn
 Leonard Cohen
 David Wilcox
 Neil Young

Most Promising Female Vocalist of the Year
Winner: Sass Jordan

Other Nominees:
 Candi
 Patti Jannetta
 Lisa Lougheed
 Michelle Wright

Most Promising Male Vocalist of the Year
Winner: Colin James

Other Nominees:
 Art Bergmann
 Michael Breen
 Andrew Cash
 Jeff Healey

Best Group
Winner: Blue Rodeo

Other Nominees:
 Glass Tiger
 Honeymoon Suite
 Rush
 Tom Cochrane & Red Rider

Most Promising Group of the Year
Winner: Barney Bentall and the Legendary Hearts

Other Nominees:
 54-40
 The Jitters
 The Northern Pikes
 The Pursuit of Happiness

Composer of the Year
Winner: Tom Cochrane

Other Nominees:
 Jim Cuddy and Greg Keelor
 David Foster
 Rita MacNeil
 Jim Vallance

Country Female Vocalist of the Year
Winner: k.d. lang

Other Nominees:
 Carroll Baker
 Sherry Kean
 Anne Murray
 Michelle Wright

Country Male Vocalist of the Year
Winner: Murray McLauchlan

Other Nominees:
 George Fox
 Matt Minglewood
 Patrick Norman
 Ian Tyson

Instrumental Artist of the Year
Winner: David Foster

Other Nominees:
 Canadian Brass
 Manteca
 Frank Mills
 Zamfir

International Entertainer of the Year
Winner: U2

Other Nominees:
 Crowded House
 INXS
 Michael Jackson
 George Michael

Producer of the Year
Winner: Daniel Lanois and Robbie Robertson, "Showdown at Big Sky" & "Somewhere Down the Crazy River" from Robbie Robertson by Robbie Robertson

Other Nominees:
 Bruce Fairbairn, "The Movie" from Permanent Vacation by Aerosmith & "Stick to Your Guns" from New Jersey by Bon Jovi
 David Foster, "Winter Games" from The Symphony Sessions by David Foster
 Jonathan Goldsmith and Kerry Crawford, "Purple Haze" & "Sempre Nel Mio Cuore" from Shaking the Pumpkin by Hugh Marsh
 Jim Vallance, "Diamond Sun" from Diamond Sun by Glass Tiger

Recording Engineer of the Year
Winner: Mike Fraser, "Calling America" & "Different Drummer" from Victory Day by Tom Cochrane&Red Rider

Other Nominees:
 Pat Glover, "Paradiso" by Skywalk
 Noel Golden and Ed Stone, "Never Say Never" from Surveillance by Triumph & "Dance Desire" from Don't Just Stand There by Haywire
 Paul Northfield, "Diamond Sun" & "I'm Still Searching" from Diamond Sun by Glass Tiger
 Bob Rock, "Bad Medicine" from New Jersey by Bon Jovi

Canadian Music Hall of Fame
Winner: The Band

Walt Grealis Special Achievement Award
Winner: Sam Sniderman

Lifetime Achievement Award
Winner: Pierre Juneau

Nominated and winning albums

Album of the Year
Winner: Robbie Robertson - Robbie Robertson

Other Nominees:
 Diamond Sun - Glass Tiger
 Outskirts - Blue Rodeo
 Racing After Midnight - Honeymoon Suite
 Reason to Believe - Rita MacNeil

Best Children's Album
Winner (tied): Fred Penner's Place - Fred Penner and Lullaby Berceuse - Connie Kaldor and Carmen Campagne

Other Nominees:
 Diamond and Dragons - Charlotte Diamond
 Qu'il y ait toujours le soleil - Charlotte Diamond
 Mr Bach Comes to Call - Susan Hammond
 Le loup de nord - Matt Maxwell
 The Orchestra - Toronto Philharmonic Orchestra

Best Classical Album: Solo or Chamber Ensemble
Winner: Schubert: Arpeggione Sonata - Ofra Harnoy

Other Nominees:
 Beethoven: Music for Cello and Piano - Desmond Hoebig and Andrew Tunis
 Chopin: Piano Works - Jon Kimura Parker
 Masters of the German Baroque - Tafelmusik Baroque Soloists
 Mozart: Piano Pieces - Jane Coop
 Wagner, Francaix, Dvorak - Canadian Chamber Ensemble and Raffi Armenian

Best Classical Album (Large Ensemble)
Winner: Bartók: Concerto for Orchestra, Music for Strings, Percussion and Celesta - Orchestre Symphonique de Montreal, Charles Dutoit conductor

Other Nominees:
 Berlioz: Harold in Italy, Rob Roy and Corsaire Overtures - Orchestre Symphonique de Montreal, Charles Dutoit conductor
 Fauro: Requiem - Orchestre Symphonique de Montreal, Charles Dutoit conductor
 Handel: Messiah - Toronto Symphony Orchestra, Andrew Davis conductor
 Mussorgsky: Pictures at an Exhibition, Night on Bare Mountain - Orchestre Symphonique de Montreal, Charles Dutoit conductor

Best Album Graphics
Winner: Hugh Syme, Levity by Ian Thomas

Other Nominees:
 Taras Chornowol, Beyond Benghazi by Paul Cram Orchestra
 J. Don Blair, Celebration by various artists
 Thomas Balint, Vertigo Tango by The Spoons
 James O'Mara, Walking Through Walls by Body Electric

International Album of the Year
Winner: Dirty Dancing soundtrack - various artists

Other Nominees:
 Bad - Michael Jackson
 Cocktail - Various Artists
 Faith - George Michael
 Hysteria - Def Leppard

Best Jazz Album
Winner: Looking Up - The Hugh Fraser Quintet

Other Nominees:
 Beyond Benghazi - Paul Cram Orchestra
 Contredanse - Karen Young and Michael Donato
 In Dew Time - Jane Bunnett
 Jean Beaudet Quartet - Jean Beaudet Quartet

Best Roots & Traditional Album
Winner: The Return of the Formerly Brothers - Amos Garrett, Doug Sahm and Gene Taylor

Other Nominees:
 Bop 'Til I Drop - Downchild Blues Band
 King Biscuit Boy aka Richard Newell - King Biscuit Boy
 Labour Day - Spirit of the West
 Swinging on a Star - Murray McLauchlan

Nominated and winning releases

Single of the Year
Winner: "Try" - Blue Rodeo

Other Nominees:
 "Diamond Sun" - Glass Tiger
 "When a Man Loves a Woman" - Luba
 "Pop Goes the World" - Men Without Hats
 "Hands Up (Give Me Your Heart)" - Sway

Best Classical Composition
Winner: Songs of Paradise - Alexina Louie

 Concerto for Harpsichord and Eight Wind Instruments - R. Murray Schafer
 River of Fire - Brian Cherney
 Siddartha - Claude Vivier
 Symphonie No 3 - Jacques Hétu

International Single of the Year
Winner: "Pump Up the Volume" - MARRS

Other Nominees:
 "Faith" - George Michael
 "A Groovy Kind of Love" - Phil Collins
 "I Think We're Alone Now" - Tiffany
 "The Locomotion" - Kylie Minogue

Best R&B/Soul Recording of the Year
Winner: Angel - Erroll Starr

Other Nominees:
 Crying For Love - Lorraine Scott
 Dancing Under a Latin Moon - Candi
 Private Property - Liberty Silver
 Secret Love - Debbie Johnson and Demo Cates

Best Reggae/Calypso Recording
Winner: Conditions Critical - Lillian Allen

Other Nominees:
 Give Peace a Chance - Errol Blackwood
 I Like Calypso - Elsworth James
 Shadrock - Chester Miller
 War on Drugs - Devon Haughton

Best Video
Winner: Michael Buckley, "Try" - Blue Rodeo

Other Nominees:
 Ron Berti, "Wait for Me" - The Northern Pikes
 James O'Mara and Kate Ryan, "Our Little Secret" - Art Bergmann
 Donald Robertson, "Ingrid and the Footman" - Jane Siberry
 Jean-Marc Pisapia, "Ordinary People" - The Box

References

External links
Juno Awards site

1989
1989 music awards
1989 in Canadian music